Joshua Eliot "Josh" Luber (born February 18, 1978) is an American entrepreneur and sneaker collector who co-founded StockX, the stock market for things. Luber worked for IBM when he founded Campless, a "sneakerhead data" company that tracked the secondary market for sneaker sales. Campless then morphed into StockX, which is an online marketplace for high-end product resale.

Luber is an expert on the sneaker resale market, and has applied that knowledge to the broader secondary market for luxury goods, a $6 billion global industry. Originally from Philadelphia, Luber is a graduate of Emory University, from which he holds a Bachelors, a M.B.A., and a J.D.

StockX was jointly founded by Dan Gilbert, Greg Schwartz, Josh Luber and Chris Kaufman in 2015, with an emphasis on the sneaker resale market. Until mid-2019, Luber was the CEO of StockX. However, he stepped down from that role upon raising a Series C, $110 million round of venture capital funding at a $1 Billion valuation for the company.

Personal life 
Luber lives with his wife and one daughter and one son in Birmingham, Michigan.

References

Video

Emory University alumni
Emory University School of Law alumni
Businesspeople from Pennsylvania
1978 births
Living people